Nikko Locastro (born September 16, 1988) is a professional disc golf player from St. Louis, Missouri.  He has been playing the sport professionally since 2006.  As of November 2022, Locastro is ranked 22nd in the world, and has the 25th highest rating, currently at 1030. 

In 2009, and then again in 2010, he broke Barry Schultz's season winnings record. He was previously sponsored by Gateway Disc Golf, Dynamic Discs, Innova Discs, and Prodigy Disc. by Westside Discs through 2021, and as of December 27th 2021 announced that he is leaving Westside for the 2022 season. In 2011, Locastro was awarded the Player of the Year award, for the third consecutive year. 
In 2022, he was disqualified at the European Open due to an incident involving Nikko threatening a tournament official. He was subsequently suspended by the PDGA for 9 months, followed by 15 months of probation.

Amateur career
Locastro ascended quickly through the amateur ranks.  In 2004, he worked his way through divisions, starting in Juniors and ending in Advanced, where he would stay until turning pro in 2006.  While he was not dominant as an amateur nationwide, he was competitive.  In 2005, he placed 34th in the Bowling Green Amateur Championships, held in Bowling Green, Kentucky, the largest disc golf tournament in the world.  2006 was his best year as an amateur.  He won three tournaments and finished third at Bowling Green and sixth at Worlds.  After worlds, Locastro decided to play professionally.

Professional career

2009 season
Locastro's 2009 season is without a doubt his breakout season.  In this season, he played 43 events and won 16 of them.  Of these wins, six were A Tier tournaments, and one was a National Tour event.  His most notable event, however, was his win in the United States Disc Golf Championship, his first major.  His win made him only the fifth different winner in this tournament.  He also bested the previous record for earnings in a year, beating Barry Schultz's total by over $2,000.

2010 season
Somehow, Locastro improved upon his previous year.  In fewer events, he managed more winnings, besting his previous record by nearly $4,000.  In addition to earning more, he was much more consistent, finishing no lower than 13th.  Among his fourteen wins were 5 A Tiers, a National Tour event, the Vibram Open, and his second major, the 2010 Japan Open, held in Tochigi, Nasu Highlands, Japan.  He also finished second at the USDGC and Scandinavian Open, both majors.

2011 season
While no majors were won this year, Locastro still had a very solid year.  In 31 events played as of November 11, he has won 15.  Of these 15 wins, 5 were A Tiers, and two were National Tour events.  One of the A Tier wins included the Stockholm Open, held in Stockholm, Sweden.  This was Locastro's only international win in 2011.  As of the September and August updates, Locastro's player rating reached 1045, at that time the second highest rating yet, behind David Feldberg's 1046.

2012 season
Locastro started out his 2012 season by winning the 13th annual Gentlemen's Club Classic. Averaging a 1070 rating over the three rounds, he took home $1,400 for his first A Tier win of the year. Shortly after on May 5–6, Locastro won his second A Tier win at the St. Louis Open tournament held annually each year. This years tournament took place at the Jefferson Barracks, Sioux Passage, and Endicott courses. Another notable win in 2012 was his in the "Ledgestone Insurance Championships Super Tour", where he took home $2,500 in winnings. Locastro finished 15th at World Championships.

Professional wins

Notable wins

Major, NT playoff record (1-0)

Summary

Annual statistics

The above information was gathered from Locastro's player page. 
†At Year End 
‡Includes Disc Golf Pro Tour Championship (not PDGA Sanctioned)

References

External links
 Nikko Locastro Website
 PDGA Stats Page

American disc golfers
Living people
1988 births